Khavas Kuh (also Romanized as Khavāş Kūh; also known as Khāş Kūh and Khas Kūhī) is a village in Aqda Rural District, Aqda District, Ardakan County, Yazd Province, Iran. At the 2006 census, its population was 21, in 9 families.

References 

Populated places in Ardakan County